Dheena is a 2001 Indian Tamil film starring Ajith Kumar.

Dheena may also refer to:

Dhina, a composer also known as Dheena
Dheena (actor), a Tamil television personality
Dheena Chandra Dhas, Indian voice actor
RJ Dheena, a Tamil radio jockey
Sai Dheena, actor